Jarosiński (masculine), Jarosińska (feminine) is a Polish-language surname. Notable people with the surname include:
Eric Jarosinski (born 1971) is an American Germanist, author, humorist, and public speaker
Łukasz Jarosiński (born 7 October 1988) is a Polish footballer 
Małgorzata Jarosińska-Jedynak (born 1979), Polish statesperson and engineer
Monika Jarosińska (born May 28, 1974) is a Polish actress and singer
Paweł Jarosiński  (born 7 July 1975) is a Polish rower

See also
 
 

Polish-language surnames

pl:Jarosiński